Brazos Country is a residential community in Austin County, Texas.

Geography
The eastern city limits of Brazos Country run along the west bank of the Brazos River. The only entrances to the city are from Chew Road. As of the 2010 census the population was 469.

There are several small, unnamed bodies of water within Brazos Country, likely manmade.

Government
City government is by mayor and city council. The Sealy Independent School District serves area students.

Brazos Country encompasses the River Ridge Golf Club  which occupies the west bank of the Brazos River.

History 
Development of the area began in the late 1970s, and the city was incorporated in May 2000.

References

External links
Brazos Country Owners Association

Cities in Texas
Cities in Austin County, Texas
Greater Houston